Branko Vrgoč (born 18 December 1989) is a Croatian professional footballer who plays as a centre-back.

Club career
Vrgoč started his career playing at youth level for his hometown club Osijek. He was loaned to Druga HNL side Slavonac CO for the 2008–09 season and helped them secure a promotion spot to the Prva HNL. However, after they were unable to find a suitable ground for hosting matches, Slavonac CO were demoted to first county league. In September 2009, Vrgoč sustained a cruciate ligament injury during the preparations for the upcoming season. He underwent three surgeries during the period of one year and missed out 2009–10 season. Manager Branko Karačić, who previously coached Vrgoč in Slavonac CO, included him in the team that underwent mid-season preparations in Turkey for the second part of the 2010–11 season. He made his debut for the first team in a goalless draw against Lokomotiva on 25 February 2011.

Career statistics
 As to 1 June 2022

Honours
Liga Leumit
Winner (1): 2016–17

References

External links
 

Branko Vrgoč at Sportnet.hr 

1989 births
Living people
Sportspeople from Osijek
Association football central defenders
Croatian footballers
Croatia youth international footballers
NK Osijek players
RNK Split players
Maccabi Netanya F.C. players
Anorthosis Famagusta F.C. players
Panetolikos F.C. players
Maccabi Petah Tikva F.C. players
Croatian Football League players
Liga Leumit players
Israeli Premier League players
Cypriot First Division players
Super League Greece players
Croatian expatriate footballers
Expatriate footballers in Israel
Expatriate footballers in Cyprus
Expatriate footballers in Greece
Croatian expatriate sportspeople in Israel
Croatian expatriate sportspeople in Cyprus
Croatian expatriate sportspeople in Greece